Minakshi Jha is a Nepali politician and a member of the House of Representatives of the federal parliament of Nepal. She was elected under the proportional representation system from Nepali Congress. She has also served as member of both the constituent assemblies.

Jha was elected with third highest popular vote to NC central working committee from 14th general convention of Nepali Congress. She is one of the closest leader to NC Vice president Bimalendra Nidhi.

References

Living people
21st-century Nepalese women politicians
21st-century Nepalese politicians
Nepali Congress politicians from Madhesh Province
Madhesi people
Place of birth missing (living people)
Nepal MPs 2017–2022
Members of the 1st Nepalese Constituent Assembly
Members of the 2nd Nepalese Constituent Assembly
1959 births